A number of monuments and memorials dedicated to the Fenian Rising of 1867 exist in Ireland. Some of the monuments are in remembrance of specific battles or figures, whilst others are general war memorials.

Ireland

See also
List of monuments and memorials to the Irish Rebellion of 1798
List of monuments and memorials to the Irish Rebellion of 1803

References 

Outdoor sculptures in Ireland
Monuments and memorials in Ireland
Lists of war monuments and memorials
Fenian